Sule Pagoda Road is a major thoroughfare of Yangon, Burma. It runs past Maha Bandula Park. The historically significant Burmese stupa Sule Pagoda is located on Sule Pagoda Road.

See also
 32nd Street, Yangon

References

Streets in Yangon